Spitsyn (Cyrillic Спи́цын), Spytsyn, or Spytsin  may refer to:

People
 Alexandr Spitsyn, archaeologist
 Ilya Spitsyn, footballer
 Valeriy Spitsyn, race walker

Archaeology
The Spitsyn culture of the early upper paleolithic Don River (modern Russia), typified by layer XVII of the Kostyonki (palaeolithic site), and named after Alexandr Spitsyn.